Carex tessellata is a species of flowering plant in the sedge family, Cyperaceae. It is known from a single herbarium specimen collected by Richard Spruce from an uncertain location in Ecuador in the nineteenth century.

References

tessellata
Flora of Ecuador
Plants described in 1908
Taxonomy articles created by Polbot